Pyro Boy (born Wally Glenn) is an American  stuntman, best known for strapping fireworks all over his body and blowing them up on stage.

Glenn lives in Emeryville, California.  His work has been featured in numerous newspapers and publications such as Life Magazine, and in television shows such as Ripley's Believe it or Not!, several specials on Discovery Channel, BBC, Channel 4, and on PBS's Nova: "Fireworks!"

"I call my act Pyro Boy," Glenn told the Financial Times in 2003. "When I'm doing it, it's really loud and it gives you a real sense of heightened awareness. It really feels like time is slowing down. It gets really, really hot because all the pyro is burning around you at a very hot temperature and the suit itself doesn't breathe."

In 2006 he was featured on Death Wish Live, a Channel 4 limited series filmed in the UK.  In it he "teased the Grim Reaper," according to The Times, and became "a human firework."

Just recently (2013), Pyro Boy was featured in the music video of the modern rock band London Grammar with their release of Strong.

References

External links 
 
Nova Teacher's Guide
Professional Fireworks Training
 Strong, by London Grammar

American stunt performers
Living people
People from Emeryville, California
Year of birth missing (living people)
Ripley's Believe It or Not!